Dontay is a male given name, meaning "lasting" or "enduring". Notable people with the given name include:

Dontay Demus Jr. (born 2000), American football wide receiver
Dontay Moch (born 1988), American former football linebacker

See also
Dontae
Donte
Deontay